Edward Oliver "Peck" Monroe (February 22, 1895 – April 29, 1969) was a  Major League Baseball pitcher. In ten career games, he had a 1–0 record, with a 3.52 ERA. He batted and threw right-handed.

Monroe was born and died in Louisville, Kentucky.

External links

1895 births
1969 deaths
Cincinnati Reds players
New York Yankees players
Major League Baseball pitchers
Baseball players from Louisville, Kentucky
Paris Bourbonites players
Lexington Colts players
Superior Brickmakers players
Frankfort Old Taylors players
Memphis Chickasaws players
St. Paul Saints (AA) players
Peoria Tractors players